The Two Orphans was a 1915 American silent romantic drama film directed by Herbert Brenon and starring Theda Bara. This film was based on the 1872 French play Les deux orphelines, by Adolphe D'Ennery and Eugene Cormon which was translated into English by N. Hart Jackson. It was the play that was being performed at the time the Brooklyn Theater Fire broke out. The film was made by Fox Film Corporation and was partially shot on location in Québec, Canada. It is now considered to be lost.

In 1921 D. W. Griffith made a second adaptation of the play, Orphans of the Storm, starring Dorothy Gish and Lillian Gish.

Cast
 Theda Bara as Henriette
Jean Sothern as Louise
 William E. Shay as Chevalier de Vaudrey
 Herbert Brenon as Pierre
 Gertrude Berkeley as Mother Frochard
 Frank Goldsmith as Marquis de Presles
 E. L. Fernandez as Jacques
 Sheridan Block as Count de Liniere
 Mrs. Cecil Raleigh as Countess De Liniere

See also
 List of lost films

References

External links

1915 films
1915 lost films
1915 romantic drama films
Fox Film films
American romantic drama films
American silent feature films
American black-and-white films
American films based on plays
Films about orphans
Films directed by Herbert Brenon
Films shot in Fort Lee, New Jersey
Films shot in Quebec
Lost American films
Lost romantic drama films
1910s American films
Silent romantic drama films
Silent American drama films
1910s English-language films